12x12 Original Remixes is a remix album by Talk Talk released initially in 1999 and again in 2001 with a new cover and artwork as Remixed. It contains the same songs as disc 1 of the earlier album Asides Besides.

It is the band's third remix album, following It's My Mix from 1985 and the controversial History Revisited from 1991. The album cover is a collage of various images associated with the band's previous albums. It features the same style Talk Talk logo as on History Revisited, the hanging goose from Asides Besides, the butterfly "face" from The Colour of Spring, the canary from The Very Best of Talk Talk, the tree of birds from Spirit of Eden, as well as numerous other animal related images. Remixed, the 2001 edition, features more simple artwork of blue and orange circles on the cover.

Reception
Allmusic described the cover as "ugly collage work".
Allmusic gave the album , saying that, despite the content being good, "you'd be better off shelling out the extra cash for Asides Besides. You'd be getting everything this disc offers, in addition to its second disc of demos and excellent B-sides.

Track list
"Talk Talk" (extended mix) – 4:34
"Today" (extended mix) – 4:33
"My Foolish Friend" (extended mix) – 5:30
"It's My Life" (extended mix) – 6:19
"Such a Shame" (extended mix) – 7:01
"Dum Dum Girl" (12" mix) – 5:23
"Without You" (12" mix) – 5:55
"Life's What You Make It" (extended mix) – 7:01
"Living in Another World" (extended remix) – 8:58
"Pictures of Bernadette" (dance mix) – 8:06
"Happiness Is Easy" (12" mix) – 7:03
"Such a Shame" (dub mix) – 6:32

References

Talk Talk remix albums
1999 compilation albums
1999 remix albums
EMI Records compilation albums
EMI Records remix albums
Talk Talk compilation albums